Russell Jack Lowther Jr. (December 27, 1922 – September 29, 1952) was an American football player. 

A native of Detroit, Lowther attended East Detroit High School (now known as Eastpointe High School, in Eastpointe, Michigan) and played college football for the Detroit Titans. He played professional football in the National Football League (NFL) as a halfback for the Detroit Lions in 1944 and for the Pittsburgh Steelers in 1945. He appeared in 10 NFL games, two as a starter, and totaled 72 rushing yards on 24 carries and 54 passing yards on 7 of 14 passes. 

After his playing career ended, he was the co-owner and sales manager of the Detroit Paint and Glass Co. He died in 1952 in a small plane crash on takeoff from the Triangle Airport in Livonia, Michigan.

References

1922 births
1952 deaths
Martin Luther King High School (Detroit) alumni
Detroit Titans football players
Detroit Lions players
Pittsburgh Steelers players
Players of American football from Detroit
American football halfbacks
Victims of aviation accidents or incidents in 1952